Sandra Jan Creamer  (born 1961) is a lawyer and Indigenous peoples' rights advocate from Mt Isa in Australia. She is also Adjunct Professor of Public Health at the University of Queensland. Her work has included lecturing, writing submissions and articles, and the development of programs.

Background
Sandra Creamer is a Waanyi and Kalkadoon woman from Mt Isa, Australia. She was raised by her father and 11 older siblings after losing her mother when she was a baby. She learned to read from her eldest sisters who did not have the opportunity to go to high school.

She holds a Bachelor of Law degree from Deakin University Institute of Koorie Education (2012) and was admitted in 2020 as a lawyer.

Creamer worked as an Indigenous Community Liaison Officer with Legal Aid Queensland, working with Indigenous women and children who were victims of crime, conducting legal information workshops and assisting in cases of racial discrimination and family law.

In 2015, Creamer attended the Human Rights Advocacy Program at the Columbia University in the City of New York. The program includes advocacy, networking, skills-building, and academic coursework, and provides advocates with the opportunity to hone practical skills, develop a deeper understanding of human rights, and foster mutually beneficial relationships with organizations and individuals in their fields.

Creamer taught in both the Tertiary Entry Program (TEP) and undergraduate courses within the Office of Indigenous Engagement of the Central Queensland University (CQU) at Rockhampton. She also supported Aboriginal and Torres Strait Islander students studying Law at CQU as a casual Learning Advisor.

In 2018, Creamer became Adjunct Professor for Public Health at the Faculty of Medicine of the University of Queensland.

Roles
In 2013, Creamer was one of the Australian delegates participating in the United Nations Permanent Forum on Indigenous Issues (UNPFII) and was the Co-Chair of the Global Indigenous Women's Caucus (GIWC) for the United Nations Permanent Forum on Indigenous Issues.

Creamer is the CEO of the National Aboriginal and Torres Strait Islander Women’s Alliance (NATSIWA) and a Board Director for both Amnesty International Australia and the International Indigenous Women’s Forum (FIMI).

In 2021, Creamer became one of the 19 members of the National Plan Advisory Group established by the Australian Government  to inform the development of the National Plan to end family, domestic and sexual violence in Australia.

She is a member of the Aboriginal and Torres Strait Islander Advisory Group established by the Queensland Human Rights Commission, a group of First Nations advocates with an interest in promoting the human rights of Aboriginal and Torres Strait Islander people in Queensland.

Creamer is Chairperson of the Board of Directors of Indigenous Peoples Rights International (2022). She is also an advisor for the Seventh Generation Board Fund whose work is dedicated to Indigenous Peoples’ self-determination and the sovereignty of Native nations.

Creamer has been a speaker at various conferences, including the STOP Domestic Violence Conference 2020 at the Gold Coast, Queensland, 2020, and the ANROWS National Research Conference on violence against women, held online in 2022. Her presentation at ANROWS had the topic: Evidence Presentation 2: Putting Aboriginal and Torres Strait Islander healing at the heart of trauma-informed policy and practice.

Recognition
In 2019, Creamer was awarded the AM (Member of the Order of Australia) for her service to Indigenous women and to human rights.

Publications
 Article in The Conversation: IPCC reports still exclude Indigenous voices. Come join us at our sacred fires to find answers to climate change
 Journal article: Five enablers to deliver safe water and effective sewage treatment to remote Indigenous communities in Australia
 Journal article: Water and health interlinkages of the sustainable development goals in remote Indigenous Australia
 Journal article: Receiving essential health services on country: Indigenous Australians, native title and the United Nations Declaration
 Journal article: Health's role in achieving Australia's Sustainable Development Goal commitments

References 

Indigenous Australian women academics
Indigenous rights activists
Members of the Order of Australia
Living people
1961 births